The  is a Kofun period burial mound, located in the Tangochomiya neighborhood of the city of Kyōtango, Kyoto in the Kansai region of Japan. The tumulus was designated a National Historic Site of Japan in 1923.

Overview
It is located at the mouth of the Takeno River, in the center of the west coast of the Tango Peninsula overlooking the Sea of Japan. It dates from the middle of the Kofun period, or the end of the 4th century to the beginning of the 5th century. The tumulus was constructed by cutting away the tip of a hill, and is orientated to the northeast. It was surveyed by Doshisha University fringe 1964 to 1967, but no excavation has been conducted. The tumulus has a length 190 meters, making it one of the largest on the Sea of Japan coast. The surface of the mound was covered in white fukiishi, and both cylindrical and figurative haniwa have been found. Among the haniwa, fragments of a type specific to the Tango region have been found, including one with a line engraving of a person rowing a boat. The details of the burial chamber are not clear, but it is presumed to be a pit-type stone chamber based on the stone slabs that were scattered in the center of the posterior circular portion of the mound. During the Kofun period, this region of northern Kyoto prefecture had trade contacts with the Asian mainland, and the area around the mouth of the Takeno River was the center of an ancient kingdom. The tumulus was situated such that its white fukiishi would be visible as a landmark for any ships approaching the harbor. However, after the middle of the 5th century, trade decreased and the political center of the region shifted inland to the Tamba region. 

During the late Heian period, a sutra mound was established on the summit of this tumulus. Artifacts recovered from this sutra mound, including sutra containers and two bronze mirrors are designated Tangible Cultural Properties of Kyōtango City.

Total length 190 meters:
Anterior rectangular portion 78 meters wide x 15 meters high, 3-tier
Posterior circular portion 129 meter diameter x 26 meters high, 3-tiers

Gallery

See also
List of Historic Sites of Japan (Kyoto)

References

External links

 Kyōtango Tourist Information home page 
Kyōtango City home page 

History of Kyoto Prefecture
Kyōtango
Historic Sites of Japan
Archaeological sites in Japan
Kofun